Peripheral artery disease (PAD) is an abnormal narrowing of arteries other than those that supply the heart or brain. When narrowing occurs in the heart, it is called coronary artery disease, and in the brain, it is called cerebrovascular disease. Peripheral artery disease most commonly affects the legs, but other arteries may also be involved – such as those of the arms, neck, or kidneys. The classic symptom is leg pain when walking which resolves with rest, known as intermittent claudication. Other symptoms include skin ulcers, bluish skin, cold skin, or abnormal nail and hair growth in the affected leg. Complications may include an infection or tissue death which may require amputation; coronary artery disease, or stroke. Up to 50% of people with PAD do not have symptoms.

The greatest risk factor for PAD is cigarette smoking. Other risk factors include diabetes, high blood pressure, kidney problems, and high blood cholesterol. The most common underlying mechanism of peripheral artery disease is atherosclerosis, especially in individuals over 40 years old. Other mechanisms include artery spasm, blood clots, trauma, fibromuscular dysplasia, and vasculitis. PAD is typically diagnosed by finding an ankle-brachial index (ABI) less than 0.90, which is the systolic blood pressure at the ankle divided by the systolic blood pressure of the arm. Duplex ultrasonography and angiography may also be used. Angiography is more accurate and allows for treatment at the same time; however, it is associated with greater risks.

It is unclear if screening for peripheral artery disease in people without symptoms is useful as it has not been properly studied. In those with intermittent claudication from PAD, stopping smoking and supervised exercise therapy improve outcomes. Medications, including statins, ACE inhibitors, and cilostazol may also help. Aspirin does not appear to help those with mild disease but is usually recommended in those with more significant disease due to the increased risk of heart attacks. Anticoagulants such as warfarin are not typically of benefit. Procedures used to treat the disease include bypass grafting, angioplasty, and atherectomy.

In 2015, about 155 million people had PAD worldwide. It becomes more common with age. In the developed world, it affects about 5.3% of 45- to 50-year-olds and 18.6% of 85- to 90-year-olds. In the developing world, it affects 4.6% of people between the ages of 45 and 50 and 15% of people between the ages of 85 and 90. PAD in the developed world is equally common among men and women, though in the developing world, women are more commonly affected. In 2015 PAD resulted in about 52,500 deaths, which is an increase from the 16,000 deaths in 1990.

Signs and symptoms

The signs and symptoms of peripheral artery disease are based on the part of the body that is affected. About 66% of patients affected by PAD either do not have symptoms or have atypical symptoms. The most common presenting symptom is intermittent claudication, which causes pain and severe cramping when walking or exercising. The pain is usually located in the calf muscles of the affected leg and relieved by rest. This occurs because during exercise the muscles of the leg need more oxygen. Normally, the arteries would be able to increase the amount of blood flow and therefore increase the amount of oxygen going to the exercised leg. However, in PAD, the artery is unable to respond appropriately to the increased demand for oxygen by the muscles, as a result, the leg muscles are overly saturated with lactic acid, resulting in pain of the muscle that only goes away with rest.

Other symptoms may include
 Pain, aches, and/or cramps in the buttocks, hip, or thigh
 Muscle atrophy (muscle loss) of the affected limb
 Hair loss of the affected limb
 Skin that is smooth, shiny, or cool to the touch in the affected area
 Decreased or absent pulse in feet
 Cold and/or numbness in the toes
 Sores/ulcers on the affected limb that do not heal

In individuals with severe PAD, complications may arise, including critical limb ischemia and gangrene. Critical limb ischemia occurs when the obstruction to blood flow in the artery is compromised to the point where the blood is unable to maintain oxygenation of tissue at rest. This can lead to pain at rest, feeling of cold, or numbness in the affected foot and toes. Other complications of severe PAD include lower limb tissue loss, arterial insufficiency ulcers, erectile dysfunction, and gangrene. People with diabetes are affected by gangrene of the feet at a rate that is 30 times higher than the unaffected population. Many of these severe complications are irreversible.

Causes

Risk factor 

Factors contributing to increased risk of PAD are the same as those for atherosclerosis. These include age, sex, and ethnicity. PAD is two times as common in males as females. In terms of ethnicity, PAD is more common in people of color compared to the white population in a 2:1 ratio. The factors with the greatest risk association are hyperlipidemia, hypertension, diabetes mellitus, chronic kidney disease, and smoking. Presenting three of these factors or more increases the risk of developing PAD ten-fold.
 Smoking – tobacco use in any form is the single greatest risk factor of peripheral artery disease internationally.  Smokers have up to a 10-fold increase in risk of PAD in a dose-response relationship. Exposure to second-hand smoke has also been shown to promote changes in the lining of blood vessels (endothelium), which can lead to atherosclerosis. Smokers are 2–3 times more likely to have lower extremity PAD than coronary artery disease. Greater than 80%-90% of patients with lower extremity peripheral arterial disease are current or former smokers. The risk of PAD increases with the number of cigarettes smoked per day and the number of years smoked.
 High blood sugar – Diabetes mellitus is shown to increase risk of PAD by 2–4 fold. It does this by causing endothelial and smooth-muscle cell dysfunction in peripheral arteries. The risk of developing lower extremity peripheral arterial disease is proportional to the severity and duration of diabetes.
 High blood cholesterol – Dyslipidemia, which is an abnormally high level of cholesterol or fat in the blood. Dyslipidemia is caused by a high level of a protein called low-density lipoprotein (LDL cholesterol), low levels of high-density lipoprotein (HDL cholesterol), elevation of total cholesterol, and/or high triglyceride levels. This abnormality in blood cholesterol levels have been correlated with accelerated peripheral artery disease. Management of Dyslipidemia by diet, exercise, and/or medication is associated with a major reduction in rates of heart attack and stroke.
 High blood pressure – Hypertension or elevated blood pressure can increase a person's risk of developing PAD. Similarly to PAD, there is a known association between high blood pressure and heart attacks, strokes and abdominal aortic aneurysms. High blood pressure increases the risk of intermittent claudication, the most common symptom of PAD, by 2.5- to 4-fold in men and women, respectively.
 Other risk factors which are being studied include levels of various inflammatory mediators such as C-reactive protein, fibrinogen, homocysteine, and lipoprotein A. Individuals with increased levels of homocysteine in their blood have a 2-fold risk of peripheral artery disease. While there are genetics leading to risk factors for peripheral artery disease, including diabetes and high blood pressure; there have been no specific genes or gene mutations directly associated with the development of peripheral artery disease.

High risk populations
Peripheral arterial disease is more common in these populations:
 All people who have leg symptoms with exertion (suggestive of claudication) or ischemic rest pain
 All people aged 65 years and over regardless of risk factor status
 All people between 50 and 69 and who have a cardiovascular risk factor (particularly diabetes or smoking)
 Age less than 50 years, with diabetes and one other atherosclerosis risk factor (smoking, dyslipidemia, hypertension, or hyperhomocysteinemia)
 Individuals with an abnormal lower extremity pulse examination
 Those with known atherosclerotic coronary, carotid, or renal artery disease
 All people with a Framingham risk score of 10%–20%
 All people who have previously experienced chest pain

Mechanism 

As previously mentioned, the most common cause of peripheral artery disease, especially in patients over 40 years old, is atherosclerosis. Atherosclerosis is a narrowing of the arteries caused by lipid or fat build up and calcium deposition in the wall of the affected arteries. The most commonly affected site occurs at arterial branch points, because there is an increase in turbulence and stress on the artery at these areas where the artery branches to supply distant structures. Disease of distant structures, including feet and toes, are usually caused by diabetes and seen in the elderly population.

Additional mechanisms of peripheral artery disease including arterial spasm, thrombosis, and fibromuscular dysplasia. The mechanism of arterial spasm is still being studied, but it can occur secondary to trauma. The symptoms of claudication ensue when the artery spasms, or clamps down on itself, creating an obstruction. Similar to atherosclerosis, this leads to decreased blood flow to the tissue downstream of the obstruction. Thrombosis, or the formation of a blood clot, occurs usually due stasis or trauma. Damage to the lining of the blood vessel begins the process of clot formation. The blood clot ultimately creates a narrowing in the artery preventing adequate blood flow and oxygen to the tissue further down.

Diagnosis

Diagnosing or identifying peripheral artery disease requires history of symptoms and a physical exam followed by confirmatory testing. These tests could include CT scans (Computed Tomagraphic Angiography), MRA scans (Magnetic Resonance Angiography), or ultrasounds for imaging. In the setting of symptoms consistent with peripheral artery disease a physician will then examine an individual for specific exam findings. Abnormal physical exam findings can lead a health care provider to consider a specific diagnosis. However, in order to confirm a diagnosis, confirmatory testing is required.

These findings are associated with peripheral artery disease:
 Decreased or absent pulses
 Muscle atrophy or wasting
 Noticeable blueness of the affected limb
 Decreased temperature (coolness) in affected limb when compared to the other
 Thickened nails
 Smooth or shiny skin and hair loss
 Buerger's test can check for pallor when the affected limb is in an elevated position. The limb is then moved from elevated to sitting position and is checked for redness, which is called reactive hyperemia. Buerger's test is an assessment of arterial sufficiency, which is the ability of the artery to supply oxygenated blood to the tissue that it goes to.
 Nonhealing lower extremity wound

If peripheral artery disease is suspected, the initial study is the ankle–brachial index (ABI). The ABI is a simple, non-invasive test, which measures the ratio of systolic blood pressure in the ankle to the systolic blood pressure in the upper arm. This is based on the idea that if blood pressure readings in the ankle are lower than those in the arm, a blockage in the arteries that provide blood from the heart to the ankle is suspected. An ABI range of 0.90 to 1.40 is considered normal. A person is considered to have PAD when the ABI is ≤ 0.90. However, PAD can be further graded as mild to moderate if the ABI is between 0.41 and 0.90, and severe if an ABI is less than 0.40. These categories can provide insight into the disease course.  Furthermore, ABI values of 0.91 to 0.99 are considered borderline and values >1.40 indicate noncompressible arteries. If an ABI >1.40 is calculated, this could indicate vessel wall stiffness caused by calcification, which can occur in people with uncontrolled diabetes. Abnormally high ABIs (>1.40) are usually considered false negatives and thus, such results merit further investigation and higher-level studies. Individuals with noncompressible arteries have an increased risk of cardiovascular mortality within a two-year period.

In individuals with suspected PAD with normal ABIs can undergo exercise testing of ABI. A baseline ABI is obtained prior to exercise. The patient is then asked to exercise (usually patients are made to walk on a treadmill at a constant speed) until claudication pain occurs (for a maximum of 5 minutes), after which the ankle pressure is again measured. A decrease in ABI of 15%–20% would be diagnostic of PAD.

If ABIs are abnormal, the next step is generally a lower limb Doppler ultrasound to look at the site of obstruction and extent of atherosclerosis. Other imaging can be performed by angiography, where a catheter is inserted into the common femoral artery and selectively guided to the artery in question. While injecting a radio-dense contrast agent, an X-ray is taken. Any blood flow-limiting blockage found in the X-ray can be identified and treated by procedures including atherectomy, angioplasty, or stenting. Contrast angiography is the most readily available and widely used imaging technique. Modern computerized tomography (CT) scanners provide direct imaging of the arterial system. Studies have shown the sensitivity and specificity of CT in identifying lesions with >50% stenosis as 95% and 96% respectively. As such, CT may be considered as an alternative to invasive angiography. An important distinction between the two is that, unlike invasive angiography, assessment of the arterial system with CT does not allow for vascular intervention

Magnetic resonance angiography (MRA) is a noninvasive diagnostic procedure that uses a combination of a large magnet, radio frequencies, and a computer to produce detailed images of blood vessels inside the body. The advantages of MRA include its safety and ability to provide high-resolution, three-dimensional imaging of the entire abdomen, pelvis and lower extremities in one sitting.

Classification

The two most commonly used methods to classify peripheral artery disease are the Fontaine and the Rutherford systems of classification. The Fontaine stages, were introduced by René Fontaine in 1954 to define severity of chronic limb ischemia:
 Stage I: asymptomatic
 Stage IIa: intermittent claudication after walking a distance of more than 200 meters
 Stage IIb: intermittent claudication after walking a distance of less than 200 meters
 Stage III: rest pain
 Stage IV: ulcers or gangrene of the limb

The Rutherford classification was created by the Society for Vascular Surgery and International Society of Cardiovascular Surgery, introduced in 1986 and revised in 1997 (and known as the Rutherford classification after the lead author, Robert B. Rutherford). This classification system consists of four grades and seven categories (categories 0–6):
 Grade 0, Category 0: asymptomatic
 Grade I, Category 1: mild claudication
 Grade I, Category 2: moderate claudication
 Grade I, Category 3: severe claudication
 Grade II, Category 4: rest pain
 Grade III, Category 5: minor tissue loss; ischemic ulceration not exceeding ulcer of the digits of the foot
 Grade IV, Category 6: major tissue loss; severe ischemic ulcers or frank gangrene

Moderate to severe PAD classified by Fontaine's stages III to IV or Rutherford's categories 4 to 5, presents limb threat (risk of limb loss) in the form of critical limb ischemia.

Recently, the Society for Vascular Surgery came out with a classification system based on "wound, ischemia and foot Infection" (WIfI). This classification system, published in 2013 was created to account for the demographic changes that have occurred over the past forty years including increased incidence of high blood sugar and evolving techniques and ability for revascularization. This system was created on the basis of ischemia and angiographic disease patterns not being the sole determinants of amputation risk. The WIfI classification system is broken up into two parts: wounds and ischemia. Wounds are graded 0 through 3 on the presence of ulceration and/or gangrene and ischemia.
 Grade 0: no ulcer, no gangrene
 Grade 1: small, shallow ulcer; no gangrene
 Grade 2: deep ulcer with exposed tendon or bone, gangrene limited to toes
 Grade 3: extensive, full-thickness ulcer; gangrene extending to forefoot or midfoot

Ischemia is graded 0 through 3 based on ABI, ankle systolic pressure, and toe pressure.
 Grade 0: ABI ≥0.80, ankle systolic pressure ≥100 mm Hg, toe pressure ≥60 mm Hg
 Grade 1: arterial brachial index 0.6 to 0.79, ankle systolic pressure 70 to 100 mm Hg, toe pressure 40 to 59 mm Hg
 Grade 2: ABI 0.4–0.59, ankle systolic pressure 50 to 70 mm Hg, toe pressure 30 to 39 mm Hg
 Grade 3: ABI ≤0.39, ankle systolic pressure <50 mm Hg, toe pressure <30 mm Hg

The TASC (and TASC II) classification suggested PAD treatment is based on the severity of disease seen on angiogram.

Screening
It is not clear if screening for disease in the general population is useful as it has not been extensively studied. This includes screening with the ankle-brachial index (ABI), although a systematic review of the literature did not support the use of routine ABI screening in asymptomatic patients.

Testing for coronary artery disease or carotid artery disease is of unclear benefit. While PAD is a risk factor for abdominal aortic aneurysms (AAA), there is no data on screening individuals with asymptomatic PAD for abdominal aortic aneurysms. In people with symptomatic PAD screening by ultrasound for AAA is not unreasonable.

Treatment
Depending on the severity of the disease, these steps can be taken, according to these guidelines:

Lifestyle
 Stopping smoking (cigarettes promote PAD and are a risk factor for cardiovascular disease)
 Regular exercise for those with claudication helps open up alternative small vessels (collateral flow) and the limitation in walking often improves.  Treadmill exercise (35 to 50 minutes, three or four times per week) has been reviewed as another treatment with a number of positive outcomes, including reduction in cardiovascular events and improved quality of life. Supervised exercise programs increase pain-free walking time and the maximum walking distance in people with PAD.

Medication
 Management of diabetes
 Management of hypertension
 Management of high cholesterol, and antiplatelet drugs such as aspirin and clopidogrel. Statins reduce clot formation and cholesterol levels, respectively, can help with disease progression, and address the other cardiovascular risks that the affected person is likely to have.

According to guidelines, taking aspirin or clopidogrel is recommended to reduce AMI ("heart attack"), stroke, and other causes of vascular death in people with symptomatic peripheral artery disease. It is recommended that aspirin and clopidogrel be taken alone and not in conjunction with one another (i.e., not as dual antiplatelet therapy). The recommended daily dosage of aspirin for treating PAD is between 75 and 325 mg, while the recommended daily dosage for clopidogrel is 75 mg. The effectiveness of both aspirin and clopidogrel to reduce risk of cardiovascular ischemic events in people with symptomatic PAD is not well established. Research also suggests that low-dose rivaroxaban plus aspirin is effective as a new anti-thrombotic regimen for PAD.

Cilostazol can improve symptoms in some. Pentoxifylline is of unclear benefit. Cilostazol may improve walking distance for people who experience claudication due to peripheral artery disease, but no strong evidence  suggests that it improves the quality of life, decreases mortality, or decreases the risk of cardiovascular events.

Treatment with other drugs or vitamins are unsupported by clinical evidence, "but trials evaluating the effect of folate and vitamin B12 on hyperhomocysteinemia, a putative vascular risk factor, are near completion".

Revascularization
After a trial of the best medical treatment outline above, if symptoms persist, patients may be referred to a vascular or endovascular surgeon. The benefit of revascularization is thought to correspond to the severity of ischemia and the presence of other risk factors for limb loss such as wound and infection severity.
  Angioplasty (or percutaneous transluminal angioplasty) can be done on solitary lesions in large arteries, such as the femoral artery, but may not have sustained benefits. Patency rates following angioplasty are highest for iliac arteries, and decrease with arteries towards the toes. Other criteria that affect outcome following revascularization are length of lesion and number of lesions. There does not appear to be long term advantages or sustained benefit to placing a stent following angioplasty in order to hold the narrowing of the subsartorial artery open.
 Atherectomy, in which the plaque is scraped off of the inside of the vessel wall (albeit with no better results than angioplasty).
 Vascular bypass grafting can be performed to circumvent a diseased area of the arterial vasculature. The great saphenous vein is used as a conduit if available, although artificial (Gore-Tex or PTFE) material is often used for long grafts when adequate venous conduit is unavailable.
 When gangrene has set in, amputation may be required to prevent infected tissues from causing sepsis, a life-threatening illness.
 Thrombolysis and thrombectomy are used in cases of arterial thrombosis or embolism.

Guidelines
A guideline from the American College of Cardiology and American Heart Association for the diagnosis and treatment of lower extremity, renal, mesenteric, and abdominal aortic PAD was compiled in 2013, combining the 2005 and 2011 guidelines. For chronic limb threatening ischemia the ACCF/AHA guidelines recommend balloon angioplasty only for people with a life expectancy of 2 years or less or those who do not have an autogenous vein available. For those with a life expectancy greater than 2 years, or who have an autogenous vein, bypass surgery is recommended.

Prognosis
Individuals with PAD have an "exceptionally elevated risk for cardiovascular events and the majority will eventually die of a cardiac or cerebrovascular etiology"; prognosis is correlated with the severity of the PAD as measured by an ABI. Large-vessel PAD increases mortality from cardiovascular disease significantly.  PAD carries a greater than "20% risk of a coronary event in 10 years".

The risk is low that an individual with claudication will develop severe ischemia and require amputation, but the risk of death from coronary events is three to four times higher than matched controls without claudication. Of patients with intermittent claudication, only "7% will undergo lower-extremity bypass surgery, 4% major amputations, and 16% worsening claudication", but stroke and heart attack events are elevated, and the "5-year mortality rate is estimated to be 30% (versus 10% in controls)".

Epidemiology
The prevalence of PAD in the general population is 3–7%, affecting up to 20% of those over 70; 70%–80% of affected individuals are asymptomatic; only a minority ever require revascularisation or amputation. Peripheral artery disease affects one in three diabetics over the age of 50. In the US, it affects 12–20 percent of Americans age 65 and older. Around 10 million Americans have PAD. Despite its prevalence and cardiovascular risk implications, there is still low levels of awareness of risk factors and symptoms, with 26% of the population the US reporting to have knowledge of PAD.

In people aged 40 years and older in the United States in 2000, rates of PAD was 4.3%. Rates were 14.5% people aged 70 years or over. Within age groups, rates were generally higher in women than men. Non-Hispanic blacks had a rates of 7.9% compared to 4.4% in Non-Hispanic whites and 3.0% (1.4%–4.6%) in Mexican Americans.

The incidence of symptomatic PAD increases with age, from about 0.3% per year for men aged 40–55 years to about 1% per year for men aged over 75 years. The prevalence of PAD varies considerably depending on how PAD is defined, and the age of the population being studied. People diagnosed with PAD have a greater risk of a MACE (Major Adverse Cardiac Event) and stroke. Their risk of developing a reinfarction/ stroke/ transient ischemic attack within one year following a heart attack increases to 22.9% compared to 11.4% for those without PAD.

The Diabetes Control and Complications Trial, and the U.K. Prospective Diabetes Study trials, in people with type 1 and type 2 diabetes, respectively, demonstrated that glycemic control is more strongly associated with microvascular disease than macrovascular disease. Pathologic changes occurring in small vessels may be more sensitive to chronically elevated glucose levels than is atherosclerosis occurring in larger arteries.

Research
Research is being done on therapies to prevent progression of PAD. In those who have developed critically poor blood flow to the legs, the benefit of autotransplantation of autologous mononuclear cells is unclear.

Only one randomized controlled trial has been conducted comparing vascular bypass to angioplasty for the treatment of severe PAD. The trial found no difference in amputation-free survival between vascular bypass and angioplasty at the planned clinical endpoint, but the trial has been criticized as being underpowered, limiting endovascular options, and comparing inappropriate endpoints. As of 2017, two randomized clinical trials are being conducted to better understand the optimal revascularization technique for severe PAD and critical limb ischemia (CLI), the BEST-CLI (Best Endovascular Versus Best Surgical Therapy for Patients With Critical Limb Ischemia) Trial, and the BASIL-2 (Bypass Versus Angioplasty in Severe Ischaemia of the Leg – 2 )Trial.

In 2011, pCMV-vegf165 was registered in Russia as the first-in-class gene therapy drug for treatment of PAD, including the advanced stage of critical limb ischemia.

References

External links 
 "Peripheral Arterial Disease" at the National Heart, Lung and Blood Institute
 Peripheral Arterial Disease (P.A.D.) at the American College of Foot and Ankle Surgeons
 

Diseases of arteries, arterioles and capillaries
Health effects of tobacco
Wikipedia medicine articles ready to translate
Wikipedia emergency medicine articles ready to translate